Exit 0 is the second studio album from American singer-songwriter Steve Earle (credited to Steve Earle & The Dukes), released in 1987. Earle was nominated for two 1988 Grammy Awards for songs on the album, Best Male Country Vocalist for "Exit 0" and Best Country Song for "Nowhere Road".

The album was recorded digitally, using the Mitsubishi X-800 at Nashville's Emerald Studios. All of the album's ten tracks were written or co-written by Earle. Earle and his band played live shows regularly during breaks in recording.

Exit 0 is stylistically very similar to its predecessor, Guitar Town, and was Earle's final pure-country album before incorporating hard rock with country on his next releases. It is today described by Allmusic as "livelier stuff than nearly anyone in Nashville was cranking out at the time".

Track listing
All songs written by Steve Earle unless otherwise noted.

Personnel
The Dukes
Bucky Baxter – steel guitar, vocals
Steve Earle – lead vocals, acoustic guitar, electric guitar, harmonica
Reno Kling – bass guitar
Mike McAdam – 6- and 12-string electric guitars, vocals
Ken Moore – organ, synthesizer, vocals
Harry Stinson – drums, vocals
With:
John Jarvis – piano
Emory Gordy, Jr. – mandolin
Richard Bennett – acoustic guitar, electric guitar, 6-string bass
K-Meaux Boudin – accordion
Technical
Chuck Ainlay – recording, mixing
Jim DeVault – front cover photography

Chart performance

References

1987 albums
Steve Earle albums
Albums produced by Tony Brown (record producer)
Albums produced by Emory Gordy Jr.
Albums produced by Richard Bennett (guitarist)
MCA Records albums